Renzo Rogo (? – ?) was an Italian paralympic swimmer and wheelchair fencer who won seven medals at the Summer Paralympics.

See also
 Italian multiple medallists at the Summer Paralympics

References

External links
 

Date of birth missing
Date of death missing
Place of birth missing
Place of death missing
Paralympic swimmers of Italy
Paralympic wheelchair fencers of Italy
Paralympic gold medalists for Italy
Paralympic bronze medalists for Italy
Paralympic medalists in swimming
Paralympic medalists in wheelchair fencing
Swimmers at the 1960 Summer Paralympics
Swimmers at the 1964 Summer Paralympics
Wheelchair fencers at the 1964 Summer Paralympics
Medalists at the 1960 Summer Paralympics
Medalists at the 1964 Summer Paralympics